A Month in the Country may refer to:

 A Month in the Country (novel), a 1980 novel by J. L. Carr
 A Month in the Country (film), a 1987 film directed by Pat O'Connor, based on Carr's novel
 A Month in the Country (play), an 1872 play by Ivan Turgenev
 A Month in the Country (ballet), a 1976 ballet choreographed by Frederick Ashton, based on Turgenev's play